The Saint Petersburg Mathematical Society is a mathematical society run by Saint Petersburg mathematicians.

Historical notes
The St. Petersburg Mathematical Society was founded in 1890 and was the third founded mathematical society in Russia after those of Moscow (1867) and Khar'kov (1879). Its founder and first president was Vasily Imshenetskii, who also had  founded earlier the Khar'kov Mathematical Society.

The Society was dissolved and subsequently revived twice, each time changing its name: sometime in between 1905 and 1917, the society ceased to function and by 1917 it had completely dissolved, perhaps due to the social agitations that destroyed many existing Russian scientific institutions.  It was re-established by the initiative of Alexander Vasilyev in 1921 as the Petrograd Physical and Mathematical Society (subsequently called the Leningrad Physical and Mathematical Society). In 1930, the self-dissolution of the society was due to political reasons. Before the beginning of World War II in 1941, Leonid Kantorovich proposed to revive the society, and a similar failed attempt was made by Vladimir Smirnov in 1953: only in 1959 Yuri Linnik did succeed in reestablishing the society (then called the Leningrad Mathematical Society). It regained the original name the St. Petersburg Mathematical Society in 1991.

Timeline of former presidents

Honorary members

Activities

"Young mathematician" prize
The "Young Mathematician" prize has been awarded since 1962.

The list of the laureates:

See also
 List of Mathematical Societies

Notes

References

.

.

.

. See also the final version available from the "George Lorentz" section of the Approximation Theory web page at the Mathematics Department of the Ohio State University (retrieved on 25 October 2009).

.
.

.

External links 
 
 

Mathematical societies
Organizations established in 1890
1890 establishments in the Russian Empire